"Superstylin'" is a song by English electronic duo Groove Armada, released as the band's first single on 13 August 2001, from the album Goodbye Country (Hello Nightclub). Vocals were performed by Groove Armada's long-time vocalist MC M.A.D. (Mike Daniels). Groove Armada credited Daniels for the cross-genre sound of the track, saying it was house music with influences of dancehall, reggae, and dub, with a speed garage bassline.

"Superstylin'" reached number 12 in the United Kingdom, number 37 in Italy, and the top 50 in Australia, Flanders, Ireland, and New Zealand. In the United States, the song reached number 40 on the Billboard Dance Club Songs chart and was nominated for a Grammy for Best Dance Recording in 2003.

Track listings

UK CD and cassette single, Australian CD single
 "Superstylin'" (G.A. 7-inch edit) – 3:43
 "Superstylin'" (G.A. Disktek mix) – 5:45
 "Tuning In" (dub mix) – 4:45

UK 12-inch single
A1. "Superstylin'" (original mix) – 6:36
B1. "Superstylin'" (G.A. Disktek mix) – 5:45
B2. "Tuning In" (dub mix) – 4:45

European CD single
 "Superstylin'" (G.A. 7-inch edit) – 3:43
 "Superstylin'" (G.A. Disktek mix) – 5:45

US CD single
 "Superstylin'" (G.A. radio edit)
 "Superstylin'" (G.A. Disktek mix)
 "Superstylin'" (Eddie Amador dub mix)
 "Tuning In" (dub mix)

US 12-inch single
A1. "Superstylin'" (album version) – 6:06
A2. "Superstylin'" (Groove Armada Disktek mix) – 5:45
B1. "Superstylin'" (Eddie Amador's Hollywood Beat dub) – 8:02

Credits and personnel
Credits are taken from the Goodbye Country (Hello Nightclub) album booklet.

Studio
 Edited and mastered at Transfermation (London, England)

Personnel

 Groove Armada – production
 Andy Cato – writing
 Tom Findlay – writing
 M.A.D. – writing (as Michael Anthony Daniel), vocals
 Daniel White – writing
 Keeling Lee – writing, guitars
 M.G. – vocals
 Jonathan White – bass

 Patrick Dawes – percussion
 Hornography – horns
 Dominic Glover – trumpet, arrangement
 Matt Colman – trombone
 Mike Smith – saxophone
 Dave Pemberton – mix engineering
 Richard Dowling – editing
 Noel Summerville – mastering

Charts

Release history

References

2001 songs
2001 singles
Groove Armada songs
Jive Records singles
Songs written by Andy Cato
UK garage songs
UK Independent Singles Chart number-one singles